Frans Christiaan Cornelis Göbel (born 11 July 1959) is a retired Dutch rower who specialized in the single sculls. In this event he won lightweight rowing world titles in 1989 and 1990 and finished second in 1988. He competed at the 1984 and 1992 Olympics and finished in 9th and 16th place, respectively.

References

1959 births
Living people
Dutch male rowers
Olympic rowers of the Netherlands
Rowers at the 1984 Summer Olympics
Rowers at the 1992 Summer Olympics
Rowers from Amsterdam
World Rowing Championships medalists for the Netherlands
20th-century Dutch people